Rade Zalad (born 26 October 1956) was a professional Serbian football goalkeeper and is now a goalkeeping coach.

Playing career
He came to FK Partizan in 1970 when he was only 14 having played earlier for his local club FK Jedinstvo Kačarevo. He joined FK Partizan senior team in 1978 and also played with Budućnost Titograd and FK Priština in the Yugoslav First League before moving to Turkey where he played with Beşiktaş J.K., Eskişehirspor and Ankaragücü.

Coaching career
As of March 2010, Zalad was the goalkeepers' coach in the Serbian national team, working under head coach Radomir Antić. He had already worked with Antić in Atlético Madrid, as well as with Celta de Vigo, Real Madrid and F.C. Barcelona.

On 10 January 2013 he signed a contract with CSKA Sofia and became goalkeeping coach. In August 2014 he became goalkeeping coach for FK Napredak Kruševac in the Serbian SuperLiga.

References

External links
 
 Profile at Strukljeva.net

1956 births
Yugoslav footballers
Serbian footballers
Süper Lig players
MKE Ankaragücü footballers
Beşiktaş J.K. footballers
Eskişehirspor footballers
FK Partizan players
FK Partizan non-playing staff
FK Budućnost Podgorica players
FC Prishtina players
Yugoslav First League players
Living people
Sportspeople from Pančevo
Serbian expatriate footballers
Expatriate footballers in Turkey
Serbian football managers
Association football goalkeepers
Association football goalkeeping coaches